Plectopylis is a genus of air-breathing land snails, terrestrial pulmonate gastropod mollusks in the family Plectopylidae. 

Plectopylis is the type genus of the family Plectopylidae.

Species
Species in the genus Plectopylis include:
 Plectopylis anguina (Gould, 1847)
 † Plectopylis antiquus Yü & Pan, 1982 
 Plectopylis cairnsi (Gude, 1898)
 Plectopylis crassilabris Páll-Gergely, 2018
 Plectopylis cyclaspis (Benson, 1859) - synonym: Plectopylis revoluta Pfeiffer, 1867
 Plectopylis feddeni (W. Blanford, 1865)
 Plectopylis karenorum (W. Blanford, 1865)
 Plectopylis linterae (Möllendorff, 1897)
 Plectopylis malayana Páll-Gergely, 2018
 Plectopylis ponsonbyi (Godwin-Austen, 1888)
 Plectopylis repercussa (Gould, 1856)
 Plectopylis thompsoni Páll-Gergely, 2018
Species brought into synonymy
 Plectopylis bensoni (Gude, 1914): synonym of Plectopylis repercussa (Gould, 1856)
 Plectopylis goniobathmos (Ehrmann, 1922): synonym of Chersaecia goniobathmos (Ehrmann, 1922) (original combination)
 Plectopylis leucochilus (Gude, 1897): synonym of Chersaecia leucochila (Gude, 1898) (original combination)
 Plectopylis lissochlamys (Gude, 1897): synonym of Chersaecia magna (Gude, 1897) (junior synonym)
 Plectopylis magna (Gude, 1897): synonym of Chersaecia magna (Gude, 1897) (original combination)
 Plectopylis woodthorpei (Gude, 1899): synonym of Chersaecia woodthorpei (Gude, 1899) (original combination)

References

 Bank, R. A. (2017). Classification of the Recent terrestrial Gastropoda of the World. Last update: July 16th, 2017

External links
 Benson, W. H. (1860). Notes on Plectopylis, a group of Helicidae distinguished by several internal plicate epiphragms; with the characters of a new species. The Annals and Magazine of Natural History, Series 3. 5(28): 243-247

Plectopylidae
Taxa named by William Henry Benson